In Bed is a 2005 Chilean film directed by Matías Bize and starring Blanca Lewin and Gonzalo Valenzuela.

It was Chile's submission to the 79th Academy Awards for the Academy Award for Best Foreign Language Film, but was not accepted as a nominee. Nevertheless, the film garnered ten awards at various film festivals.

Plot
In a Santiago motel room, two young middle-class individuals engage in lovemaking. They had met while leaving a party and don't know each other's names. As the night progresses and they continue to have sex, they eventually reveal their names to each other; he is Bruno and she is Daniela. In between their intimate moments, they share more details about their lives, their sorrows, and their fears. Bruno pretends that the woman calling him on his cellphone is his ex-girlfriend and confesses that he is moving to Belgium for postgraduate study. Daniela admits that her fiancé can be violent but she plans to marry him anyway. Their initial passion evolves into sharing confidences and even tenderness, but she insists that this will be her last fling before getting married.

Cast
 Blanca Lewin as Daniela
 Gonzalo Valenzuela as Bruno

Remake
The 2010 film Room in Rome is loosely based on In Bed.

See also

 Cinema of Chile
 List of submissions to the 79th Academy Awards for Best Foreign Language Film

References

External links

2005 films
2000s Spanish-language films
2000s erotic drama films
Films shot in Chile
Films set in Chile
Chilean drama films
Erotic drama films
Two-handers
2005 drama films